The 2019 SMP F4 Championship was the first season of the SMP F4 Championship, following the closure of the preceding F4 North European Zone Championship at the end of 2018. The 7 round-provisional calendar gets all circuits in Russia. The series is situated with Russian Circuit Racing Series. But addition to the calendar was made after the scheduled 7th round in Sochi was cancelled. 7th round rescheduled return in Finland and Formula Academy Finland races at Alastaro, where the grid was joined by the final round of Formula 4 SMP.

Drivers
All cars are run by Russian team SMP Racing. All drivers use the  Tatuus-Abarth F4-T014 chassis.

Calendar
1 to 6 rounds scheduled to support 2019 Russian Circuit Racing Series. An addition to the calendar was made after the scheduled 7th round in Sochi was cancelled. 7th round rescheduled return in Finland.

Championship standings

Points system

Points are awarded as follows:

Drivers standings

References

External links
 

SMP F4 Championship seasons
SMP F4 Championship
SMP F4 Championship
SMP F4
SMP F4